Style is the ninth album by the funk band Cameo, released in 1983. It was their first album to introduce their Atlanta Artists label, with which they maintained their distribution through Polygram Records.

At the time, Cameo was going through a transition, having gone from five members (Alligator Woman, 1982) to four, with an extreme makeover in their sound. Their former big funk band sound was now being replaced by all the elements of the electronic age (i.e., keyboards, synthesizers and Simmons drums). Their music was self-proclaimed as "21st Century Bebop" and the band prided themselves on the use of non-conventional drums.

Track listing
 "Aphrodisiac" – 5:00 (L. Blackmon, C.Singleton, N.Leftenant, T.Jenkins)
 "This Life Is Not for Me" - 3:30 (L. Blackmon, C.Singleton, N.Leftenant, T.Jenkins)
 "You're a Winner" - 3:30 (L. Blackmon, C.Singleton, N.Leftenant, T.Jenkins)
 "Can't Help Falling in Love" - 3:50 (L.Creatore, H.Peretti, G.D.Weiss)
 "Interlude (Serenity)" - 1:30 (C.Singleton)
 "Style" - 5:12 (L. Blackmon, C.Singleton, N.Leftenant, T.Jenkins)
 "Cameo's Dance" - 3:23 (L. Blackmon, C.Singleton, N.Leftenant, T.Jenkins)
 "Let's Not Talk Slot" - 3:31 (L. Blackmon, C.Singleton, N.Leftenant, T.Jenkins)
 "Slow Movin'" - 3:24 (L. Blackmon, C.Singleton, N.Leftenant, T.Jenkins)
 "Heaven Only Knows" - 3:37 (L. Blackmon, C.Singleton, N.Leftenant, T.Jenkins)

Personnel
 Larry Blackmon - vocals, drums, percussion, bass guitar
 Tomi Jenkins - lead and backing vocals
 Charlie Singleton - vocals, guitars, bass guitar, keyboards, synthesizers
 Nathan Leftenant - backing vocals
 Kevin Kendrick - Prophet, Jupiter 8, Fender Rhodes, grand piano, Mini Moog, Yamaha grand piano

Charts
Pop Albums - #53
Black Albums - #14

References

Cameo (band) albums
1983 albums